Henry Alcock (1717-1812) was an Irish politician.

Alcock was educated at Trinity College, Dublin. He was M.P. for Clonmines in County Wexford from 1761 to 1768; and Waterford City from 1783 to 1797; for Fethard in County Wexford in 1798.

References

Alumni of Trinity College Dublin
Irish MPs 1761–1768
Irish MPs 1783–1790
Irish MPs 1790–1797
Irish MPs 1798–1800
Members of the Parliament of Ireland (pre-1801) for County Waterford constituencies
Members of the Parliament of Ireland (pre-1801) for County Wexford constituencies
1812 deaths
1717 births